Pseudochromis aureolineatus, the gold-lined dottyback, is a species of ray-finned fish from the  Comores and Indonesia in the Indian Ocean, which is a member of the family Pseudochromidae.

References

Gill, A.C., 2004. Revision of the Indo-Pacific dottyback fish subfamily Pseudochrominae (Perciformes: Pseudochromidae). Smith. Monogr. (1):1-213.

aureolineatus
Taxa named by Anthony C. Gill
Fish described in 2004
Fish of the Indian Ocean